Ny Teknik (meaning New Technology in English) is a weekly Swedish magazine with news, debates and ads in the field of technology and engineering. It is published in Stockholm, Sweden.

History and profile
Ny Teknik was launched on 18 October 1967. Its former publisher was Ekonomi och Teknik Förlag AB. The magazine is headquartered in Stockholm and is published by Talentum Sweden.

It is distributed  to all members of The Swedish Association of Graduate Engineers. The magazine mostly covered news about inventions until 1997 when a new section, Frontlinjen (meaning Front Line), was started to feature news on technological research. The magazine also includes news on the effects of technology on society, IT and telecom.

As of 2006 the editor-in-chief was Lars Nilsson. Susanna Baltscheffsky also served as the editor-in-chief. Jan Huss is the editor-in-chief of the magazine. Corresponding publications are Ingeniøren in Denmark, Teknisk Ukeblad in Norway and Technisch Weekblad in the Netherlands.

In 2006 Ny Teknik had a circulation of 146,500 copies. In 2008 the magazine sold 153,900 copies. Its circulation was 156,400 copies in 2010.

References

External links
 

1967 establishments in Sweden
Ny Teknik
Magazines established in 1967
Magazines published in Stockholm
Swedish-language magazines
Weekly magazines published in Sweden